Ilim-Ilimma I (reigned middle 16th century BC - c. 1524 BC - Middle chronology) was the king of Yamhad (present-day Halab) succeeding his father Abba-El II.

Reign
Ilim-Ilimma is known through the inscriptions found on the Statue of his Son Idrimi: his queen belonged to Emar royalty, and he had many children of which Idrimi was the youngest.

Ilim-Ilimma was under the threats of king Parshatatar of Mitanni, and a rebellion probably instigated by him ended Ilim-Ilimma's reign and life in ca. 1524 BC, and the royal family fled to Emar.

Dynasty's Fate
Aleppo came under the authority of Mitanni, while Idrimi stayed in exile for seven years, after which he conquered Alalakh and continued the dynasty as the King of Mukis. Ilim-Ilimma I was the last king of the Yamhad dynasty to rule as King of Halab; his grandchild Niqmepa might have controlled Halab, but as king of Alalakh.

References

Citations

1525 BC deaths
16th-century BC rulers
Kings of Yamhad
People from Aleppo
Amorite kings
Yamhad dynasty
16th-century BC people